Lokti is a rural locality (a selo) in Moshkovsky District of Novosibirsk Oblast, Russia. It is part of Barlaksky Selsoviet. Population: 247 (2010 Census).

The rural locality is located northeast of Novosibirsk on the Bolshoi Barlak River.

History 
According to the "List of inhabited places of Siberian Krai" (1928) Lokti was founded in 1576, but most likely this date is a mistake, since the Russians had not yet settled in Siberia at that time.

In 1899, shops, a drinking establishment, a grain warehouse and a school were in the village.

See also
 Barlak, a rural locality to the south

References

External links
 Lokti: development of the settlement in the second half of the 19th century and the first third of the 20th century. Library of Siberian Local History.

Rural localities in Novosibirsk Oblast